De Vriese is a Flemish surname. It is one of several Belgian equivalents of the much more numerous Dutch family name De Vries.

Notable people with this family name include:
Bertha De Vriese (1877–1958), Belgian physician
Emmerik De Vriese (born 1985), Belgian footballer
Willem Hendrik de Vriese (1806–1862), Dutch botanist and physician (standard botanical author abbreviation: de Vriese)

Dutch-language surnames
Surnames of Belgian origin
Ethnonymic surnames